Martyn David Barrett, FBPsS, FAcSS, FRSA (born 18 June 1951) is a British social scientist. He was educated at the University of Cambridge and the University of Sussex, and originally specialised in developmental psychology. He taught at Roehampton Institute of Higher Education (1978-1987), Royal Holloway and Bedford New College, University of London (1987-1993) and the University of Surrey (1993-2012). Since 2012, he has held the position of Emeritus Professor of Psychology at the University of Surrey. 

Barrett conducted his doctoral research on language acquisition, including semantic development, pragmatic development and holophrasis (sentence words), and published several books on the development of language in children. He subsequently worked on the development of children's national identity and ethnic identity, the development of national, ethnic and racial attitudes and prejudice in children and adolescents, and the development of civic engagement and political participation in youth, ethnic minorities and migrants. He led three multinational research projects on these topics funded by the European Commission: Children’s Beliefs and Feelings about their Own and Other National Groups in Europe, The Development of National, Ethnolinguistic and Religious Identity in Children and Adolescents living in the New Independent States of the former Soviet Union, and Processes Influencing Democratic Ownership and Participation (PIDOP).

Since 2006, Barrett has been a consultant for the Council of Europe. In this role, he has participated in a number of intercultural education and citizenship education projects, including: developing the Autobiography of Intercultural Encounters; editing a book examining the similarities and the differences between interculturalism and multiculturalism; co-authoring a statement paper on Developing Intercultural Competence through Education; leading the development of the Reference Framework of Competences for Democratic Culture; and acting as the lead expert on assessment for the Education Policy Advisers Network. 

Barrett has also worked for the Organisation for Economic Co-operation and Development (OECD), helping to design the global competence assessments for use in PISA 2018.

References

External links
 Home page 
 Google Scholar page

1951 births
Fellows of the Academy of Social Sciences
Living people